, commonly abbreviated to ASH, is a performing arts school in Hiroshima, Japan, founded in 1999. It is managed by the production company , a subsidiary of Shinhiroshima Telecasting, and is located within TSS Production offices. It has a longstanding business relationship with the talent agency Amuse, Inc. In October 2017, ASH opened a branch school near Fukuyama Station in Fukuyama, the second-largest city in Hiroshima Prefecture.

Activities 
Classes offered at Actor's School Hiroshima include acting, singing, dancing, and modelling.

ASH maintains several internal idol groups, which membership consists of its active students and perform both in internal and outside events, allowing them to obtain real-world experience.

ASH holds recitals, or "Acts", twice a year in the spring and autumn. The audience is allowed to record the performances using professional equipment. Students may perform solo or in groups, and the internal idol groups also perform there.

Alumni relations 
On March 31, 2019, to commemorate the school's 20th anniversary, ASH students performed a medley of songs released by their notable alumni in that year's Spring Act.

In 2019, Riho Sayashi, formerly of Morning Musume, became a support dancer for Babymetal. This was considered a "shocking" occurrence in the Japanese entertainment industry, especially since Sayashi held a prominent position in her former group and both groups belong to different management companies. Sayashi and Babymetal lead singer Suzuka Nakamoto's relationship at ASH, where they were considered rivals and two of the top students of their time, is believed to have an influence on this.

On December 1, 2020, Arisa Mineyoshi of STU48 covered "Ijime, Dame, Zettai" by Babymetal in the final rounds of the AKB48 Group No. 1 Singer Contest.

On February 2, 2021, Nikkan SPA! reported on a series of concerts at the Nippon Budokan by three different musical acts fronted by ASH graduates, which it dubbed the "Budokan ASH Relay". It started with STU48, which performed there on January 15 and announced that Chiho Ishida would be the lead performer in their sixth single. Mitsuki Imamura, the group's captain, tweeted after the show "We left the baton at the Budokan", and =Love leader Anna Yamamoto tweeted "We received the baton" before her group performed there the next day. Babymetal would also perform in Budokan on the 19th and 20th, the first two shows in a planned ten-day performance.

On September 20, 2021, STU48 announced the "New Wave Project", an STU48 trainee recruitment process exclusively for active ASH students, at the 2021 ASH Autumn Act.

Notable faculty 
 MIKIKO

Notable alumni 
Perfume
 Yuka Kashino (1st class)
 Ayano Omoto (1st class)
 Ayaka Nishiwaki (1st class)
 Yuka Kawashima (former member) (1st class)
 Riho Sayashi, solo singer, former member of Morning Musume, former support dancer of Babymetal (12th class)
 , model, former member of Sakura Gakuin (12th class)
 Suzuka Nakamoto, former member of Karen Girl's and Sakura Gakuin, member of Babymetal (15th class)
 Himeka Nakamoto, former first generation member of Nogizaka46 (16th class)
 , member of =Love
 Anna Murashige, member of HKT48
 Yuri Tani, former member of AKB48 Team 8
 , member of 
STU48
 1st Generation: Mitsuki Imamura, Chiho Ishida, Marina Otani (former), Arisa Mineyoshi,  (former; currently a model)
2nd Generation: Sara Shimizu, Yuna Kawamata, Yura Ikeda
 New Wave Project: Azumi Okada, Rio Okamura, Yuka Kurushima, Noa Morokuzu (a.k.a. Noa Mitsuki)
 , member of Juice=Juice (19th class)
 Aina Yoshida, former member of Pink Babies
 , performed the Japanese end credits version of Frozen II theme, "Into The Unknown"
 , member of Sakura Gakuin
 , member of Ocha Norma (31st class)
 Airi Taniguchi, member of Sakurazaka46

References

External links 

  
About ASH, officially endorsed blog 

Dance schools
Schools of the performing arts in Japan
Schools of the performing arts
Buildings and structures in Hiroshima